Olenegorsk is a rural locality (a selo), the only inhabited locality, and the administrative center of Yukagirsky Rural Okrug of Allaikhovsky District in the Sakha Republic, Russia, located  from Chokurdakh, the administrative center of the district. Its population as of the 2010 Census was 254; down from 308 recorded in the 2002 Census.

References

Notes

Sources
Official website of the Sakha Republic. Registry of the Administrative-Territorial Divisions of the Sakha Republic. Allaikhovsky District. 

Rural localities in Allaikhovsky District